The 2006–07 Cypriot Third Division was the 36th season of the Cypriot third-level football league. Ermis Aradippou won their 3rd title.

Format
Fourteen teams participated in the 2006–07 Cypriot Third Division. All teams played against each other twice, once at their home and once away. The team with the most points at the end of the season crowned champions. The first three teams were promoted to the 2007–08 Cypriot Second Division and the last three teams were relegated to the 2007–08 Cypriot Fourth Division.

Point system
Teams received three points for a win, one point for a draw and zero points for a loss.

Changes from previous season
Teams promoted to 2006–07 Cypriot Second Division
 AEM Mesogis
 ASIL Lysi
 Akritas Chlorakas

Teams relegated from 2005–06 Cypriot Second Division
 Elpida Xylofagou
 Ethnikos Assia
 SEK Agiou Athanasiou

Teams promoted from 2005–06 Cypriot Fourth Division
 Anagennisi Germasogeias
 Olympos Xylofagou
 FC Episkopi

Teams relegated to 2006–07 Cypriot Fourth Division
 Achyronas Liopetriou
 Enosis Kokkinotrimithia
 AEK Kythreas

League standings

Results

See also
 Cypriot Third Division
 2006–07 Cypriot First Division
 2006–07 Cypriot Cup

Sources

Cypriot Third Division seasons
Cyprus
2006–07 in Cypriot football